Shevchenkovo is a rural locality (a selo) in Pasekovskoye Rural Settlement, Kantemirovsky District, Voronezh Oblast, Russia. The population was 355 as of 2010. There are 4 streets.

Geography 
Shevchenkovo is located 22 km north of Kantemirovka (the district's administrative centre) by road. Pasekovo is the nearest rural locality.

References 

Rural localities in Kantemirovsky District